John Van Zandt (died 1847) was an American abolitionist who aided the Underground Railroad resistance movement in Ohio after having been a slaveholder in Kentucky. Sued for monetary damages by a slaveholder whose escaped slaves he aided, he was a party to Jones v. Van Zandt (1847), a case by which abolitionists intended to challenge the constitutionality of slavery. The case was decided by the United States Supreme Court against Van Zandt; it upheld the right of Congress and the obligation of the government to protect slavery, as it was established under the Constitution. Van Zandt was ruined financially by the decision and died later that year.

Background
While living in Evendale, Ohio, Van Zandt often illegally harbored slaves in the basement of his house and helped them escape to the North. In the 1840s, he was caught.  He was excommunicated from the Sharon Methodist Episcopal Church, which had already joined the Southern portion of the national congregations, although he was a trustee and had helped found it.  They judged his anti-slavery activities to be "immoral and un-Christian conduct." Despite this, he continued to harbor slaves, but was caught again.

Van Zandt was charged for monetary damages by Wharton Jones, a slaveholder who lost his property, in what became known as Jones v. Van Zandt (1847), which was settled by the US Supreme Court. Abolitionists pressed the case to challenge the constitutionality of slavery.  Despite being defended by Salmon P. Chase, future Secretary of Treasury for Abraham Lincoln and Chief Justice of the United States from 1864 to 1873, Van Zandt was ruled against by the court. In a decision by Chase's predecessor, Chief Justice Roger B. Taney, the court determined that slavery was protected by the Constitution, and the federal government had the right and obligation to support it; thus the 1793 Fugitive Slave Law was constitutional. States could determine whether slavery would be legal within their borders.  Through years of challenging his legal case, Van Zandt lost all his land and property. He had to place his eleven children with relatives across the country. He died later that year.

Aftermath
Hoping to settle the issue of slavery, Chief Justice Taney increased sectional tensions in the nation. In 1850 Southerners pushed through a new Fugitive Slave Act that required states to support enforcement and increased the penalties for those aiding escaped slaves.  It also added to the tensions across the country.

Legacy and honors
On June 19, 2005, the Sharonville United Methodist Church (the pro-slavery Southern faction rejoined the mainline Methodist Church in the 20th century) attracted national press attention when it posthumously restored Van Zandt's membership.  About a dozen Van Zandt descendants traveled to the city to accept a formal letter of apology by the church for the expulsion of their ancestor for his anti-slavery activities.

In popular culture
Van Zandt was believed to have been the basis for the character of Van Trompe in Harriet Beecher Stowe's bestselling Uncle Tom's Cabin (1852), which helped rouse anti-slavery activists.

References

Methodists from Ohio
People excommunicated by Methodist churches
Underground Railroad people
1847 deaths
Year of birth missing
People from Hamilton County, Ohio
Methodist abolitionists